Oakham is the county town of Rutland in the East Midlands of England,  east of Leicester,  south-east of Nottingham and  west of Peterborough. It had a population of 12,149 in the 2021 census. Oakham is to the west of Rutland Water and in the Vale of Catmose.

Toponymy
The name of the town means "homestead or village of Oc(c)a" or "hemmed-in land of Oc(c)a".

Governance
Local governance for Oakham is provided for by the single-tier unitary Rutland County Council, which is based in the town. Oakham is a civil parish with a town council.

Oakham, along with Melton Mowbray in Leicestershire and the rest of Rutland, has been represented at Westminster by the Conservative Member of Parliament Alicia Kearns since 2019.

Having lain within the historic county boundaries of Rutland from a very early time, it became part of the non-metropolitan county of Leicestershire from 1974 to 1997. Historically, Oakham had been one of the five hundreds of the county. The town was in Oakham Rural District from 1894 to 1911, then Oakham Urban District from 1911 to 1974.

Demography
Women in the Oakham South East ward had the fifth highest life expectancy at birth, 95.7 years, of any ward in England and Wales in 2016.

The urban area of the town now extends into the neighbouring parish of Barleythorpe, to the north-west of the town centre.

Landmarks
Tourist attractions in Oakham include All Saints' Church and Oakham Castle. Another historic feature is the open-air market held in the town's market place every Wednesday and Saturday. Nearby is the Buttercross with an octagonal stone-slate roof and the wooden stocks – both Grade I listed buildings.

All Saints' Church

The spire of Oakham parish church, built during the 14th century, dominates distant views of the town for several miles in all directions. Restored in 1857–1858 by Sir George Gilbert Scott, the church is a Grade I listed building.

Oakham Castle

Only the great hall of the Norman castle is still standing, surrounded by steep earthworks marking the inner bailey. The hall dates from about 1180–1190. The architectural historian Nikolaus Pevsner, in his Leicestershire and Rutland volume of the Buildings of England series, noted; “It is the earliest hall of any English castle surviving so completely, and it is doubly interesting in that it belonged not to a castle strictly speaking, but rather to a fortified manor house.” The building is decorated with Romanesque architectural details, including six carvings of musicians. It is a Grade I listed building. The hall was in use as an assize court until 1970 and is still occasionally used as a coroner's court or Crown Court. It is also licensed for weddings.

The outer bailey of the castle, which is still surrounded by low earthworks, lies to the north of the castle. Known as Cutts Close, it is now a park. The park has some deep hollows which are remnants of the castle's dried-up stew ponds (fishponds). A  named HMS Oakham Castle was launched in July 1944.

Oakham's horseshoes

Traditionally, members of royalty and peers of the realm who visited or passed through the town had to pay a forfeit in the form of a horseshoe. This unique custom has been enforced for over 500 years, but nowadays it only happens on special occasions (such as royal visits), when an outsize ceremonial horseshoe, specially made and decorated, is hung in the great hall of the castle. There are now over 200 of these commemorative shoes on its walls. Not all are dated and some of the earliest (which would doubtless have been ordinary horseshoes given without ceremony by exasperated noblemen) may not have survived. The earliest datable one is an outsize example commemorating a visit by King Edward IV in about 1470. Recent horseshoes commemorate visits by Princess Anne (1999), Prince Charles (2003) and Princess Alexandra (2005). The horseshoes hang with the ends pointing down; while this is generally held to be unlucky, in Rutland this was thought to stop the Devil from sitting in the hollow. The horseshoe motif appears in the county council's arms and on Ruddles beer labels.

Rutland County Museum

The museum is located in the old Riding School of the Rutland Fencible Cavalry which was built in 1794–1795. The museum houses a collection of objects relating to local rural and agricultural life, social history and archaeology.

Transport

The Birmingham–Peterborough line runs through the town, providing links to Birmingham, Leicester, Peterborough, Cambridge and Stansted Airport. Oakham railway station is positioned about halfway between Peterborough railway station and Leicester railway station, at both of which passengers can board trains to London – from Leicester to London St Pancras or from Peterborough to London King's Cross. There are also two direct services to London St Pancras (one early morning and one evening), and one evening return service from London St Pancras, each weekday.

The Oakham Canal connected the town to the Melton Mowbray Navigation, the River Soar and the national waterways system between 1802 and 1847.

Most buses in Oakham are operated by Centrebus including the Rutland Flyer to Melton Mowbray.

Education

Oakham School is an English public school, founded together with Uppingham School in 1584. The original school building survives, north-east of the church. It has across its south front the inscription Schola Latina – Graeca – Hebraica A° 1584 and above its door a stone with an inscription in Latin, Greek and Hebrew.

Oakham School is the owner of the town's former workhouse. Built in 1836–1837 by the Oakham Poor Law Union, it held 167 inmates until its conversion into Catmose Vale Hospital. It now contains two of the school houses for girls.

Catmose College, founded in 1920, is a state-funded secondary school. Harington School is a sixth form centre next to it. Rutland County College, previously Rutland Sixth Form College, moved from the outskirts of the town to Great Casterton.

Sports and recreation
Oakham United Football Club won the Peterborough and District Football League in 2015 and gained promotion to the United Counties League First Division.

Oakham Rugby Football Club plays at the Rutland Showground.

Oakham Cricket Club plays at the Lime Kilns off Cricket Lawns.

Notable people
Stuart Broad (born 1986), cricketer
John Furley (1847–1909), cricketer
Sir Jeffrey Hudson (1619 – c. 1682) became a royal court dwarf.
Tom Marshall – artist and photo colouriser, grew up in Oakham.
Thomas Merton (1915–1968), a religious scholar, studied at Oakham School in 1929–1932.
Titus Oates (1649–1705), perjuror
Weston Stewart (1887–1969), Anglican bishop
Jonnie Peacock (born 1993), Paralympic runner

Twin towns
Oakham is twinned with:
 Barmstedt, Germany
 Dodgeville, Wisconsin, United States

Gallery

References

External links

Oakham Town Council
Oakham Town Partnership
Discover Oakham
All Saints Church, Oakham
Oakham Castle
Rutland County Council
Oakham workhouse

 
Towns in Rutland
County towns in England
Civil parishes in Rutland
Market towns in Rutland